Embiran is a 2019 Indian Tamil language realistic thriller film directed by Krishna Pandi, starring Rejith Menon, Radhika Preethi and T. S. B. K. Moulee. Rejith Menon played as Priyan, Radhika Preethi as Jeya and T. S. B. K. Moulee played grandfather of Jeya. The story revolves around two young people from different professions who fall in love with each other.

Cast

Rejith Menon as Priyan
 Radhika Preethi as Jeya
T. S. B. K. Moulee as Jeya's Grandfather 
 Kalyani Natarajan as Priyan's mother
 Villiyappan

Filming

The film has been shot around Tamil Nadu and Pondicherry.

Soundtrack

The film has music by Prasanna, who has previously created music for the Yagavarayinum Naa Kaakka movie. It features lyrics by Kabilan Vairamuthu. The songs are mostly montages and features one song in duet.
Tamil

Release 
New Indian Express called it "an uninteresting film that romanticizes stalking".

References

External links
 

Indian thriller films
Films set in Chennai
2010s Tamil-language films
2017 thriller films